Chasm Creek is a rural locality in the local government area (LGA) of Burnie in the North-west and west LGA region of Tasmania. The 2016 census recorded a population of 68 for the state suburb of Chasm Creek.

History 
Chasm Creek was gazetted as a locality in 1966.

Geography
The waters of Bass Strait form the northern boundary. The Western Railway Line passes through from north-east to north-west.

Road infrastructure 
National Route 1 (Bass Highway) runs from north-east to north-west.

References

Towns in Tasmania
Burnie, Tasmania